Grays Lake may refer to:
Grays Lake (Cleveland County, Arkansas), a lake
Grays Lake (Pulaski County, Arkansas), a lake
Grays Lake (Idaho), a lake
Grays Lake (Illinois), a lake
Grayslake, Illinois, a village